Černá is a village close to Lomnice nad Popelkou, Czech Republic. Černá is an administrative part of Lomnice nad Popelkou.

External links 
portal.gov.cz

Populated places in Semily District
Neighbourhoods in the Czech Republic